Baghan (also Romanized as Bāghān) is a village in Shonbeh Rural District of Shonbeh and Tasuj District of Dashti County, Bushehr province, Iran. At the 2006 census, its population was 1,171 in 237 households. The following census in 2011 counted 1,478 people in 359 households. The latest census in 2016 showed a population of 1,574 people in 415 households; it was the largest village in its rural district.

References 

Populated places in Dashti County